Start International Polska is a Polish dubbing and voice-over translation studio based in Warsaw.

The studio was founded in 1995. The company commissions voice-over translations of content for DVD distributors and TV channels. Start International Polska is also one of the dubbing studios that Nickelodeon (Poland) works with, the other being Master Film.

Clients
 Cartoon Network Poland
 Canal+ Poland
 Nickelodeon (Poland)
 Ale Kino!
 Cinema City Poland
 Cyfrowy Polsat
 Disney Character Voices International
 Disney Channel Poland
 Forum Film Poland
 Monolith Films
 Nelvana
 SPI International Polska
 Kuchnia.tv
 Planète Poland
 Universal Studios
 United International Pictures
 Warner Bros.
 Telewizja Polska
 TVN (Poland)
 DreamWorks
 ZigZap
 MiniMini
 and more

Staff

Directors
 Bartosz Wierzbięta
 Agata Gawrońska-Bauman
 Andrzej Chudy
 Marek Klimczuk
 Artur Kaczmarski
 Elżbieta Kopocińska
 Marek Robaczewski
 Wojciech Paszkowski
 Paweł Galia
 Anna Apostolakis

Sound and assembly
 Hanna Makowska
 Janusz Tokarzewski
 Michał Skarżyński
 Jerzy Wierciński
 Sławomir Czwórnóg
 Paweł Tymosiak
 Piotr Kamiński

Content

Cartoons
 Angelina Ballerina: The Next Steps
 South Park
 Pingu
 Hey Arnold! (old and new dubs)
 101 Dalmatians: The Series
 Angel's Friends
 Anthony Ant
 The Wild Thornberrys
 Camp Lazlo
Sitting Ducks
 Droopy, Master Detective
 Kampung Boy
 Codename: Kids Next Door
 Martin Mystery
 Dora the Explorer
 Dastardly and Muttley in Their Flying Machines (new dub)
 The Cramp Twins (season 1 and 2)
 Charlie and Lola (episodes 1–16)
 The Angry Beavers
 Dex Hamilton: Alien Entomologist
 Go, Diego, Go!
 It's a Big Big World
 Generation O!
 Wide-Eye
 2 Stupid Dogs
 Fantômette
 Fimbles
 Winx Club (seasons 3–7, specials)
 George Shrinks
 Dumb and Dumber
 Globtrotter Grover
 The Magilla Gorilla Show (new dub)
 Fat Dog Mendoza
 Jacob Two-Two
 Johnny Bravo
 Hong Kong Phooey
 Egyxos
 and a lot more

Live action series
 Goosebumps (Episodes 47–66)
 iCarly
 Big Time Rush
 True Jackson, VP
 Bear in the Big Blue House
 and more

Voice artists
 Brygida Turowska
 Modest Ruciński
 Wit Apostolakis-Gluziński
 Monika Pikuła
 Dominika Kluźniak
 Jaroslaw Boberek
 Justyna Bojczuk
 Maksymilian Michasiów
 Aleksandra Traczyńska
 Krzysztof Szczerbiński
 Marcin Hycnar
 Tomasz Bednarek
 Janusz Wituch
 Agnieszka Matysiak
 Wojciech Paszkowski
 Anna Sztejner
 Olga Zaręba
 Agnieszka Kunikowska
 Mirosława Krajewska
 Robert Tondera
 Joanna Pach
 Ewa Serwa
 Grzegorz Drojewski
 Adrian Perdjon
 Wojciech Machnicki
 Krzysztof Bednarek
 Piotr Makarski
 Artur Kaczmarski
 Radosław Popłonikowski
 Włodzimierz Bednarski
 Klaudiusz Kaufmann
 Tomasz Steciuk
 Damian Kulec
 Jacek Mikołajczak
 Zdzisław Wardejn
 Krzysztof Cybiński
 Jonasz Tołopiło
 Jacek Kopczyński
 Marcin Kudełka
 Robert Więckiewicz
 Arkadiusz Bazak
 Leszek Zduń
 Piotr Janusz
 Cezary Kwieciński
 Jacek Bończyk
 Barbara Zielińska
 Paweł Ciołkosz
 Andrzej Chudy
 Anna Sroka
 Miłogost Reczek
 Joanna Jeżewska
 Izabela Dąbrowska
 Paweł Szczesny
 Włodzimierz Press
 Grzegorz Kwiecień
 Marek Bocianiak
 Barbara Kałużna
 Małgorzata Puzio
 Elżbieta Gaertner
 Jan Kulczycki
 Jacek Wolszczak
 Franek Boberek
 Łukasz Lewandowski
 Arkadiusz Jakubik
 Jakub Truszczyński
 Adam Pluciński
 Mirosław Zbrojewicz
 Tomasz Marzecki
 Janusz Bukowski
 Jolanta Zykun
 Zuzanna Galia
 Izabella Dziarska
 Jolanta Mrotek
 Jolanta Wilk
 Joanna Jędryka
 Hanna Kinder-Kiss
 Józef Mika
 Krzysztof Strużycki
 Krzysztof Królak
 Ewa Telega
 Tomasz Kot
 Joanna Jabłczyńska
 Mirosława Dubrawska
 Barbara Melzer
 Monika Błachnio
 Wojciech Duryasz
 Joanna Orzeszkowska
 Natalia Jankiewicz
 Kajetan Lewandowski
 Cezary Nowak
 Mirosław Wieprzewski
 Joanna Szczepkowska
 Julia Kołakowska
 Agata Kulesza
 Aleksandra Koncewicz
 Elżbieta Kopocińska
 Magdalena Walach
 Małgorzata Foremniak
 Edyta Jungowska
 Lucyna Malec
 Stanisław Brejdygant
 Marta Czarkowska
 Iwona Rulewicz
 Andrzej Gawroński
 Dominika Sell
 Mikołaj Klimek
 Marta Zgutczyńska
 Przemysław Stippa
 Jacek Rozenek
 Jakub Molęda
 Piotr Bajtlik
 Katarzyna Kozak
 Rafał Kołsut
 Joanna Kudelska
 Julia Hertmanowska
 Beata Jankowska-Tzimas
 Marek Robaczewski
 Małgorzata Kożuchowska
 Dorota Lanton
 Elżbieta Jędrzejewska
 Magdalena Różczka
 Tomasz Jarosz
 Maciej Miecznikowski
 Artur Żmijewski
 Jacek Lenartowicz
 Angelika Kurowska
 Cezary Pazura
 Błażej Wójcik
 Marcin Dorociński
 Marcin Perchuć
 Anna Ułas
 Przemysław Sadowski
 Hanna Śleszyńska
 Hania Stach
 Daniel Olbrychski
 Piotr Warszawski
 Sonia Bohosiewicz
 Małgorzata Sadowska
 Andrzej Grabowski
 Piotr Bąk
 Marek Obertyn
 Przemysław Nikiel
 Łukasz Nowicki
 Jarosław Domin
 Paweł Iwanicki
 Mirosław Baka
 Artur Dziurman
 Tomasz Borkowski
 Aleksander Wysocki
 Dariusz Kowalski
 Katarzyna Skolimowska
 Klementyna Umer
 Bartosz Obuchowicz
 Włodzimierz Szaranowicz
 Maria Pakulnis
 Cezary Morawski
 Łukasz Zagrobelny
 Jan Janga-Tomaszewski

See also
Studio Sonica
 Master Film

References

External links
 Official Site
 

Film production companies of Poland
Companies established in 1995
1995 establishments in Poland
Companies based in Warsaw
Mass media in Warsaw
Polish dubbing studios